Philippe Nassif (1971 – 18 March 2022) was a French journalist and writer. In 2011, he was editorial advisor to Philosophie Magazine, and worked for the Madame Figaro, or ADN» and responsible for the "Essays" section of Technikart.

Biography

Studies and journalistic career
Student at the Institute of Political Studies in Paris, with Charles Pépin, he joined the magazine Technikart, responsible for the "Essays" section and reviewed contemporary authors Slavoj Žižek, Peter Sloterdijk, Bernard Stiegler before becoming editorial advisor to Philosophie Magazine. On 18 March 2022, Nassif died by suicide, at the age of 50.

Works
In 2002, he published Welcome to a useless world, the adventures of Jean No with Denoël editions; with Mehdi Belhaj Kacem, he published Pop philosophie, a work popularizing the thought of Alain Badiou and in 2011, The Initial Struggle: Leaving the Empire of Nihilism.

Bibliography
 Bienvenue dans un monde inutile. Les aventures de Jean-No, la fashion victim la plus sympathique de France, Éditions Denoël, 2002 
 Pop philosophie. Entretiens avec Mehdi Belhaj Kacem, Éditions Denoël, 2005 
 La lutte initiale : Quitter l'empire du nihilisme, Éditions Denoël, 2011

References

1971 births
2022 deaths
2022 suicides
French journalists
People from Beirut
20th-century French non-fiction writers
20th-century French male writers
French people of Lebanese descent